Marina Azyabina (born 15 June 1963) is a retired Russian hurdler who competed in the 100 metres hurdles. Her personal best was 12.47 seconds, achieved in June 1992 in Moscow. She was a silver medallist for Russia at the 1993 World Championships in Athletics and later won a bronze medal at the 1994 Goodwill Games in Saint Petersburg. She competed for the Soviet Union before its dissolution, winning gold in the hurdles at the 1991 Summer Universiade.

At national level she was the 1993 winner at the Russian Athletics Championships, and also won at the 1992 CIS Athletics Championships.

International competitions

See also
List of World Athletics Championships medalists (women)

References

1963 births
Living people
Russian female hurdlers
Soviet female hurdlers
Olympic female hurdlers
Olympic athletes of the Unified Team
Athletes (track and field) at the 1992 Summer Olympics
Universiade gold medalists for the Soviet Union
Universiade gold medalists in athletics (track and field)
Medalists at the 1991 Summer Universiade
Goodwill Games medalists in athletics
Competitors at the 1994 Goodwill Games
World Athletics Championships athletes for Russia
World Athletics Championships medalists
CIS Athletics Championships winners
Russian Athletics Championships winners